Mendo de Sousa (1120s-1192) was a Portuguese Count, Patron of the Monastery of Pombeiro and Mordomo-mór of Sancho I of Portugal.

Biography 

Born in Portugal, Mendo was the son of Gonçalo de Sousa and Urraca Sanches de Celanova, a noble woman, granddaughter of Henry, Count of Portugal and Theresa. Mendo de Sousa was the husband of Maria Rodrigues Veloso, daughter of Count Rodrigo Velloso.

Mendo de Sousa was a direct descendant of Sueiro Belfaguer, 1st Lord House of Sousa.

References

External links 
Apontamentos genealogicos sobre a familia Portugal da Silveira" - archive.org

1120s births
1192 deaths
12th-century Portuguese people
Portuguese nobility
Portuguese Roman Catholics